The Fourth Executive was, under the terms of the Northern Ireland Act 1998, a power-sharing coalition.

Following the 6 May 2016 elections to the fifth Northern Ireland Assembly, the Democratic Unionist Party and Sinn Féin remained the two largest parties in the Assembly.

Notably for the first time in the assembly's history, parties entitled to seats on the executive could instead opt to go into formal opposition. The UUP, SDLP and Alliance all took up this option, leaving the DUP and Sinn Féin to form a government.

The 4th Northern Ireland Executive was formed on 25 May 2016. It lasted less than a year, and collapsed on 16 January 2017 following the resignation of deputy First Minister McGuinness in protest at the Renewable Heat Incentive scandal.

4th Executive of Northern Ireland

See also 
List of Northern Ireland Executives
Members of the Northern Ireland Assembly elected in 2016

References

Northern Ireland Executive
Northern Ireland, Executive of the Northern Ireland Assembly 5th
Ministries of the Northern Ireland Assembly
2016 establishments in Northern Ireland
Cabinets established in 2016
2017 disestablishments in Northern Ireland
Cabinets disestablished in 2017
Ministries of Elizabeth II